The Rural Post Roads Act of 1916 provided federal aid in the United States to the states for the construction of rural post roads, construed to mean any public road over which the United States mail was then transported. President Woodrow Wilson signed the bill into law on July 11, 1916.

References

1916 in American law
United States federal postal legislation
United States federal transportation legislation